Estádio Manoel Schwartz, usually known as Estádio das Laranjeiras, is a historic football stadium in Rio de Janeiro state, Brazil. The stadium holds 2,000 spectators. It was built in 1905 and is one of the oldest stadiums in Brazil. The stadium is owned by  Fluminense Football Club.

History
Fluminense acquired a plot at Guanabara Street (currently named Pinheiro Machado street) in 1902. The stadium bleachers were built in 1905 and its maximum capacity was 5,000 people.

The Brazil national football team played its first match in 1914, at Laranjeiras Stadium, against Exeter City, of England. The match ended 2–0 to Brazil.

The stadium was renovated in 1919 and its capacity was expanded to 19,000 people. The re-inaugural match was played on May 11 of that year, when the Brazil national football team beat the Chile national football team 6–0. The first goal of the stadium after the re-inauguration  was scored by Brazil's Friedenreich. In the same year, Brazil hosted the South American Championship, and all matches of the competition were played at Estádio das Laranjeiras. Brazil won that competition which was the first title achieved by the  Seleção. The stadium was again expanded in 1922 to host  South American Championship  and its maximum capacity was expanded to 25,000 people. The capacity was reduced to 8,000 people in 1961 after the demolition of bleachers' part due to the construction of a viaduct at Pinheiro Machado Street.

The stadium's attendance record for Fluminense currently stands at 25,718 people, set on June 14, 1925 when Fluminense beat Flamengo 3–1.

On 20 July 2014, Exeter City played out a 0–0 friendly draw against Fluminense under 23s in a game commemorating the 100th anniversary of Brazil's first match. Around 600 fans attended the game, with over 170 of them being Exeter fans.

References

External links

 Templos do Futebol
 Extensive article and photos about the stadium's history 
 Matches of Brazil National Football Team in Laranjeiras at RSSSF
 Marches when titles were decided in Laranjeiras Stadium at RSSSF

Fluminense FC
Laranjeiras
Copa América stadiums